Gábor Kucsera may refer to:

 Gábor Kucsera (swimmer) (1949–2015), Hungarian swimmer
 Gábor Kucsera (canoeist) (born 1982), Hungarian sprint canoeist